is a 1955 color Japanese film directed by Umetsugu Inoue.

Cast
 Ruriko Asaoka (浅丘ルリ子)
 Frankie Sakai (フランキー堺)
 Mie Kitahara (北原三枝)
 Minoru Takada (高田稔)
 (内海突破)
 (市川俊幸)
 Ayuko Fujishiro (藤代鮎子)
 Ichirō Arishima

Overview
A musical action film for children, this is the first feature-length theatrical film shot in Konicolor. It's based on the eponymous novel by Makoto Hojo, and marked the debut of 14-year-old Ruriko Asaoka, who plays a girl on the run from a spy ring trying to steal her father's scientific secrets.

References

1955 films
Films directed by Umetsugu Inoue
Nikkatsu films
Japanese musical films
1955 musical films
1950s Japanese films